, also called Haruta & Chika, is a Japanese mystery novel series by Sei Hatsuno. Kadokawa Shoten has published five novels since October 2008. A manga adaptation published by Kadokawa Shoten in Monthly Shōnen Ace began serialization in December 2015. An anime television series adaptation titled Haruchika: Haruta & Chika by P.A. Works premiered on January 7, 2016. A live-action film adaptation of the same name was released on March 4, 2017.

Plot
Haruta and Chika are members of their high school wind instrument club that is on the verge of being shut down because there are only four members. The two are childhood friends that got split up but reunited nine years later, and they spend their days studying and also trying to recruit new members. When a mysterious event occurs within their school, they band together in order to solve the mystery.

Characters

Played by: Kanna Hashimoto
Chika is a first-year high school student. She was a tomboy girl who wants to changes her image to be a girly girl by joining the Brass Club. She plays the flute.

 
Played by: Shori Sato
Haruta is a first-year high school student. He is Chika's childhood friend, but is often attacked by her as a running gag. He lives alone in a small apartment to escape the exploitation of his three elder sisters. Haruta gains a huge popularity, both in and outside the school campus due to his capability of solving mysteries. He plays the French horn.

Played by: Keisuke Koide
The school's music teacher and club supervisor. He was once a famous conductor, but suddenly retired and became a music teacher instead. He is the center of Chika and Haruta's attention. Like Haruta, Kusakabe is also a capable detective and always solves the problem first before Haruta, but allows Haruta and Chika to discover things for themselves.

A second year student. She plays the oboe. She stopped playing for a year following the death of her younger brother, until Haruta completed a supposedly unsolvable Rubik's cube for her and told her that she needs to put the past behind her and keep on living.

A first year student. He plays the alto saxophone. He is a Chinese-American and was born in China, but due to the country's one-child policy, his parents put him up for adoption with the intent of giving him a better life elsewhere. He was briefly a member of the drama club, but he joined the brass band club after being defeated by Haruta in an acting challenge.

She is a lively girl who leads the first-year members. She plays the bass trombone. She first met the brass club in order to solve a mystery involving her grandfather. She later joins upon entering high school, when Haruta, Chika, and the rest of the first-years became second-years.

Played by: Hiroya Shimizu
Naoko's childhood friend who plays percussion. He had withdrawn from school for a year during which he was a radio announcer on the indie radio program "Frequency 77.4 MHz," where he and a group of senior citizens give out advice to listeners.

Played by: Yuri Tsunematsu
A first-year student. She is a clarinet player who dreamed of playing professionally until she started losing her hearing. She has completely lost the hearing in her left ear and is partially deaf in her right ear as well. She was the only main character who didn't actually join the brass club, only being a supporter of the group and one of Chika's music mentors. However, she eventually joins after watching them at competition.

Played by: Koki Maeda
The Brass Club's president. He plays the trumpet.

A second-year high school student and Sae's older twin sister. She plays the clarinet.

A second-year high school student and Kae's younger twin sister. She plays the bass tuba.

Media

Print
The Haruchika series of mystery novels are written by Sei Hatsuno. The first novel in the series was published by Kadokawa Shoten on October 29, 2008 in a tankōbon format; five volumes have been published in this format as of September 30, 2015. Kadokawa Shoten has also released the series in bunkobon format starting on July 24, 2010 featuring cover illustrations by Yoko Tanji for the first three volumes, and Hiko Yamanaka for the subsequent volumes. The Taiwan print version features illustrations by Rum.

A manga adaptation illustrated by Būta, with character designs by Namaniku ATK, began serialization in Kadokawa Shoten's Monthly Shōnen Ace with the December 2015 issue, published on October 26. The first tankōbon was released on December 26, 2015.

Novel list

Anime
An anime television series adaptation titled , produced by P.A. Works and directed by Masakazu Hashimoto, premiered on January 7, 2016 on Tokyo MX. Namaniku ATK provided the character designs. The series is licensed by Funimation in North America and the British Isles, and is simulcast on their website. Madman Entertainment licensed the series in Australia and New Zealand, and the series is simulcasting on AnimeLab. Anime Limited is releasing the series for Funimation in the United Kingdom and Ireland.

Episode list

Film

A live-action film adaptation of the same name starring Shori Sato of the idol group Sexy Zone and Kanna Hashimoto premiered on March 4, 2017.

References

External links

 

2008 Japanese novels
2016 anime television series debuts
2016 Japanese television series endings
Japanese children's novels
Japanese mystery novels
Japanese novels adapted into films
Japanese serial novels
Kadokawa Dwango franchises
P.A.Works
Funimation
Shōnen manga
Music in anime and manga
Mystery anime and manga
Japanese novels adapted into television shows
Television shows based on Japanese novels
Tokyo MX original programming
Children's mystery novels
2008 children's books